Anna "Annie" Cogswell Wood (born in Winchester, VA, August 2, 1850, died in Florence, Italy, February 9, 1940) was an American writer, art collector, teacher, and the co-founder of Leache-Wood Seminary in Norfolk, Virginia. When writing, she wrote under both her own name and the pseudonym Algernon Ridgeway. Upon the death of her friend, Irene Leache, she founded the Irene Leache Memorial Collection, now a part of the Chrysler Museum of Art in Norfolk.

Life
Wood's father was Algernon Ridgeway Wood, a Virginia General Assemblyman who married Louisa Cogswell. In 1850 he moved his wife and newborn daughter, Annie Cogswell Wood, to New York. The Cogswells were an illustrious family, with a lineage stretching to the Colonial era. In 1865, Wood's aunt, Elizabeth Lord Cogswell Dixon, married James Dixon, a United States Representative and Senator from Connecticut and close ally to President Abraham Lincoln. Elizabeth Dixon and her sister, Mary Cogswell Kinney, befriended Mary Todd Lincoln, President Lincoln's wife, during the tumult of the Civil War. When president Lincoln was shot, a distraught Lincoln sent a messenger to summon her close friends Elizabeth Dixon and Mary Kinney from their homes in Lafayette Square.

Leache and Wood met at Valley Female Seminary in Winchester, Virginia in 1868 while both resided at the Seminary's main campus building, known as "Angerona". Anna Wood was a student and Irene Leache was a newly hired faculty member.

Wood's great-grandfather's name was Dr. Nathaniel Cogswell, a shipping merchant and gunrunner in the mid 18th century. His fortune was inherited by his brother, the Rev. Dr. Jonathan Cogswell. The reverend had no sons, and Annie's mother, Louise, and her two sisters, inherited the money. When Louise divorced Annie's father, she retained her fortune, which then passed to her daughter, Annie, in 1891, the same year Annie and Irene left for Europe, after running the Leache-Wood Seminary for nearly two decades.

In early 1900, Leache's health began to fail while in Europe. Leache and Wood returned to the States, and Leache died on December 2, 1900. Shortly after, Wood established the Irene Leache Library and she returned to Europe. She then began to send works of art back to Norfolk.

Upon her death in 1940, Wood left her estate to the Irene Leache Memorial. Wood and Leache are both buried at Elmwood Cemetery, Norfolk City, Virginia.

Works
 Diana Fontaine. A novel, Philadelphia, J.B. Lippincott Company, 1891
 Westover's ward, London, R. Bentley, 1892
 The story of a friendship. A memoir, New York, Knickerbocker Press, 1901
 Idyls and impressions of travel from the note-books of two friends, New York & Washington, Neale Pub. Co., 1904
 Drama sketches for parlor acting or recitation, Florence, Editori Librai, 1925
 The great opportunity and other essays, Florence, Italy, 1926
 The psychology of crime illustrated by several modern poets, Florence, TIP. Giuntina

References

Further reading
  Annie Wood a portrait: the life and times of the founder of the Irene Leache Memorial by Jo Ann Mervis Hofheimer, Norfolk, VA : Irene Leach Memorial, Chrysler Museum of Art, 1996.

20th-century American novelists
American women novelists
1850 births
1940 deaths
20th-century American women writers
19th-century American women writers
19th-century American novelists
People from Norfolk, Virginia
People from Winchester, Virginia
Novelists from Virginia
American women non-fiction writers
19th-century American non-fiction writers
20th-century American non-fiction writers